The 12819 / 12820 Odisha Sampark Kranti Express is a bi-weekly train which runs between Bhubaneswar, capital of Odisha and . This train was introduced as part of the Sampark Kranti trains that were announced by the then railway minister Nitish Kumar in 2005. It was and still is a bi-weekly train. Earlier the train used to terminate at New Delhi railway station (NDLS) but now terminates at Anand Vihar Terminus (ANVT) of New Delhi. Its rakes are maintained by East Coast Railway (ECoR).

Rake composition 
This train consists of 1 First AC, 1 AC 2-Tier coach, 6 AC 3-Tier coaches, 7 Sleeper coaches, 2 General coaches,1 Pantry Car, 1 Divyang-cum-Guard Coach and 1 EOG coach. Hence making it a 20 Coach Train.

Stoppage

Loco link 

As the route is fully electrified. this train gets a WAP-7 locomotive of Ghaziabad Shed end to end.

Sampark Kranti Express trains
Rail transport in Odisha
Rail transport in West Bengal
Rail transport in Jharkhand
Rail transport in Uttar Pradesh
Rail transport in Delhi
Railway services introduced in 2005